Crossed Trails is a 1948 American Western film directed by Lambert Hillyer and written by Adele Buffington. The film stars Johnny Mack Brown, Raymond Hatton, Lynne Carver, Douglas Evans, Kathy Frye and Zon Murray. The film was released on April 11, 1948 by Monogram Pictures.

Plot

Cast              
 Johnny Mack Brown as Johnny Mack
 Raymond Hatton as Bodie Clark
 Lynne Carver as Maggie Flynn
 Douglas Evans as Jim Hudson
 Kathy Frye as Melissa Hendrix
 Zon Murray as Curtin
 Mary MacLaren as Mrs. Laswell
 Ted Adams as Bill Laswell
 Steve Clark as Blake
 Frank LaRue as Judge
 Milburn Morante as Steve Anderson
 Bob Woodward as Wright 
 Pierce Lyden as Whitfield
 Henry Hall as Stoddard
 Hugh Murray as Jury Foreman
 Bud Osborne as Sheriff

References

External links
 
 
 
 

1948 films
1940s English-language films
American Western (genre) films
1948 Western (genre) films
Monogram Pictures films
Films directed by Lambert Hillyer
American black-and-white films
1940s American films